Bonellia is the scientific name of several genera of organisms and may refer to:

Bonellia (annelid) Rolando, 1821, a genus of spoon worms in the family Bonelliidae
Bonellia (gastropod) Deshayes, 1838, a genus of snails in the family Eulimidae
Bonellia (plant), a genus of plants in the family Primulaceae